{{safesubst:#invoke:RfD||2="(Raimi-Verse)" as a disambiguator|month = March
|day =  6
|year = 2023
|time = 20:37
|timestamp = 20230306203743

|content=
REDIRECT J. Jonah Jameson (film character)

}}